Dobovec pri Rogatcu is a settlement east of the town of Rogatec in eastern Slovenia. The area traditionally belonged to the Styria region. It is now included in the Savinja Statistical Region.

Name
The name of the settlement was changed from Dobovec to Dobovec pri Rogatcu in 1953.

Church
The local parish church, built on a small hill above the settlement, is dedicated to Saint Roch and belongs to the Roman Catholic Diocese of Celje. It was originally built in the 17th century and rebuilt in the 18th century.

References

External links
Dobovec pri Rogatcu on Geopedia

Populated places in the Municipality of Rogatec